Curry mee is a Maritime Southeast Asian spicy noodle soup garnished with various toppings. In Johor and Singapore, it is sometimes called curry laksa. Numerous variants of the dish, including preparations with a drier or thicker gravy, exist in both the countries of Malaysia and Singapore.

Preparation
A typical preparation of Malaysian/Singaporean-style curry mee consists of thin yellow noodles or rice vermicelli immersed in a spiced broth enriched with coconut milk, accompanied with chilli or sambal relish. Potential toppings for curry mee include chicken, prawns, cuttlefish, cockles, boiled eggs, pieces of deep fried tofu puffs, fried foo chuk, green beans, bean sprouts and mint leaves.

In Malaysia and Singapore, Chinese-style preparations often include pork products, such as fried lard croutons and cubes of pig blood curd. Curry mee prepared for Muslim customers exclude pork products in compliance of halal dietary laws.

Variants
Two versions can be found in the northern Malaysian state of Penang, which differs from the Singaporean version in the south: a bright orange chicken curry version, or a pale and thin coconut broth version known as white curry mee. Its capital city of George Town is famous for its curry mee, which is considered a staple favourite among local residents. A notable stall in the Ayer Itam area, which was operated by a pair of sisters for over 70 years, is renowned for its version of the dish and its founders have become local cultural icons.

Some versions of the dish are prepared with a gravy which is drier and thicker in consistency. The city of Ipoh in Perak state is known for its dry curry noodles, which is often topped with pieces of cooked chicken, char siu or roast pork.

Curry mee is also available as a flavour for commercial instant noodles. Unusual variants which trended on social media involve boiling Maggi brand instant curry mee together with Milo powder or serving it with KitKat chocolate bars.

See also
 Khao soi - a curry noodle dish in northern Thailand
 Mie aceh – found in Aceh Province, Indonesia

References

Foods containing coconut
Malaysian noodle dishes
Noodle soups
Singaporean noodle dishes
Spicy foods
Street food